Vitali Ivanovich Zaprudskikh (born 1 January 1991) is a Russian football player.

Club career
Zaprudskikh made his debut in the Russian Second Division for FC Sibir-2 Novosibirsk in 2008.

He made his Russian Football National League debut for FC Sibir Novosibirsk on 8 April 2013 in a game against FC Sakhalin Yuzhno-Sakhalinsk. He played 6 seasons in the FNL.

On 1 August 2020, FC Noah announced that Zaprudskikh had left the club.

References

External links
 
 
 Profile by Sportbox
 Profile at Crimean Football Union

1991 births
Footballers from Tambov
Living people
Russian footballers
Association football defenders
FC Sibir Novosibirsk players
FC Baltika Kaliningrad players
FC Volgar Astrakhan players
FC Tambov players
FC Noah players
FC Slutsk players
FC Spartak Tambov players
Russian First League players
Russian Second League players
Armenian Premier League players
Belarusian Premier League players
Crimean Premier League players
Russian expatriate footballers
Expatriate footballers in Armenia
Russian expatriate sportspeople in Armenia
Expatriate footballers in Belarus
Russian expatriate sportspeople in Belarus